William Alston (19 April 1884 – 1971) was a Scottish footballer who played in the Football League for Lincoln City.

References

1884 births
1971 deaths
Scottish footballers
Association football midfielders
English Football League players
Lincoln City F.C. players
Rochdale A.F.C. players